Hannah Schmidt (born 4 August 1994) is a Canadian freestyle skier who competes internationally in the ski cross discipline.

Career
Schmidt has been part of the national team since 2018. In 2021, Schmidt has a breakout season, marked by a top 10 performance at the World Championships.

On January 24, 2022, Schmidt was named to Canada's 2022 Olympic team along with her brother Jared Schmidt, who will also compete in the women's ski cross event.

References

External links 
 

1994 births
Living people
Canadian female freestyle skiers
Skiers from Ottawa
Freestyle skiers at the 2022 Winter Olympics
Olympic freestyle skiers of Canada